Albert E. Shaw was an English professional footballer who played as a winger.

References

English footballers
Association football wingers
Chilton Colliery Recreation F.C. players
Grimsby Town F.C. players
English Football League players